Bronwen is a Welsh feminine given name. It is closely associated with the similar name Branwen, which appears in medieval Welsh literature. Used in Wales since the 19th century, it was introduced to the English-speaking public at large by a character in the Richard Llewellyn novel How Green Was My Valley (1939).

Notable bearers of the name include:
 Bronwen Astor (1930–2017), English model
 Dame Bronwen Holdsworth (born 1943), New Zealand businesswoman and arts patron
 Bronwen Dickey (born 1981), American author
 Bronwen Hughes, Canadian film director
 Bronwen Knox, Australian water polo centre back/centre forward
 Bronwen Maher (born 1957), Irish politician
Bronwen Manby, British human rights scholar and lobbyist 
 Bronwen Mantel (born 1950), Canadian actress
 Bronwen Saunders (born 1978), Canadian curler
 Bronwen Wallace (1945–1989), Canadian poet and short story writer

See also
 Branwen
 Bronwyn

References

Welsh feminine given names